Josef von Fodor (16 July 1843 – 19 March 1901) was a Hungarian professor of hygiene at the University of Buda-Pesth and pioneer of public health.

Early life and education 
Birth

Josef von Fodor was born on 16 July 1843 in Lakócsa, Somogy County of Hungary.

Family 
Josef's father was Galántai Fodor Antal [Hu] and his mother was Mary Picha. He had a daughter, Margit Fodor who married Zsigmond Gerlóczy.

Education 
He studied medicine at Buda-Pesth, Vienna, and Munich and was awarded Doctor of Medicine (MD) from Buda-Pesth on 19 October 1865. He completed a degree as a master of ophthalmology and obstetrics, and on 17 July 1866 he completed a degree in surgery.

Around 1870, von Fodor took a Wanderjahr with the support of a state grant to visit the largest cities of Europe (Austria, Germany, Netherlands, Belgium, England) to study their hygiene practices.

Death 
Professor von Fodor died on 19 Mar 1901 from sequelae of influenza supervening on arterial sclerosis He is buried at Rijeka Road Graveyard.

Career 
Professor von Fodor made significant contributions in teaching hygiene, investigating the connection between public health and conditions of water and air, and also studied many other projects including disinfectants and the effects of carbon monoxide, which he introduced the first quantitative analytical method for determining carboxyhemoglobin saturation. Professor von Fodor was among the first to demonstrate the spread of typhoid through water. In 1886 he reported the in vivo bactericidal activity of the blood, concluding that the organism was protected against the spread of bacteria by an unknown vital power of blood, and in 1887 he demonstrated in vitro that whole blood is able to reduce anthrax bacilli.

It has also been suggested Prof. von Fodor was the first to suggest establishing a National Institute for Public Health and a Regional Institute of Public Health and Epidemiology.

Appointments 

 1866 - Assistant to the Chair of State Medicine at Buda-Pesth
 c. 1866 - Inspector of Deaths in Buda-Pesth
 1869 - Prosector/dissecting doctor of the Hospital of St. Roch. (Saint Rokus)
 1869 - qualified as Privat-docent
 1870 - Studied at the University of Munich under Max Josef von Pettenkofer and Justus von Liebig
 c. 1870 - Worked at Friedrich Daniel von Recklinghausen and Albert Hilger’s institute at the University of Würzburg
 1872 - appointed Ordinary Professor of State Medicine at University of Klausenburg (or University of Kolozsvár)
 1874 - appointed Chair of Hygiene at the University of Buda-Pesth
 c. 1890 - elected Dean of the Faculty of Medicine
 1894 - elected Rector of the university

Achievements 
As the Chair of Hygiene, Professor von Fodor influenced sanitation reform throughout Hungary. 

In 1885, Professor von Fodor played a key role in founding the Institution of School of Medical Officers, and established the Hungarian National Health Association with Lajos Markusovszky.

He served as editor of the Bulletin of the Society of Public Health "Health" from 1887, and edited a section of the Hungarian Medical Journal called Public Health and Forensic Medicine. Professor von Fodor was regarded as a pioneer of modern public health.

Awards and honors 

 1874 - Great Prize of the Hungarian Academy of Sciences
 1883 - Hygienic Exhibition (Berlin), awarded Empress-Queen Augusta gold medal for preventative medicine
 1891 - International Congress of Hygiene (London), awarded honorary degree of LL.D. from University of Cambridge
 Honorary member of the German Public Health Association (Verein fur Offentliche Gesundheitspflege)
 Member of public health associations of Paris, Brussels, Florence and London
 prizes from the Hungarian Academy of Sciences and Royal Medical Association of Buda-Pesth
 appointed to the Presidents of the Superior Health Council of Hungary
 Honorary member of the Association of Medical Officers of Great Britain
 nominated for the Nobel Prize in Physiology or Medicine by Andreas Hoegyes and by Anton von Genersich
 1909 - on 29 August 1909 the National Public Health Association erected a bronze bust ( the work of György Vastagh Jr. ) in the capital, in the VIII. district Gutenberg Square, with the inscription “First Apostle of Our Public Health” engraved on the sculpture foundation. In Kaposvár, a full-length bronze statue, in its native village, Lakócsa, Somogy county, also a bust and a memorial plaque mark the memory of the famous native of the village.

Publications 

 1869 - About outside toilet systems with regard to domestic conditions, especially of Pest, 1869
 1873 - Sanitary Administration in England / Public health in England with regard to the situation of medicine, health regulations, forensic medicine and the conditions in Hungary.
 1875 - on soil and soil gases
 1877 - Healthy houses and dwellings
 1878 - Das gesunde Haus und die gesunde Wohnung. Braunschweig,
 1878 - Official report on the universal exhibition held in Paris in 1878 III
 1879 - The Public Health. Bp
1880 - Das Kohlenoxyd vom hygienischen Standpunkt. Pest. med. chir. Presse, Budapest, 1880, xvi, 42
 1881 - 
 1882 - 
 1885 - the conditions of longevity
 1886 - Bacterien im blute lebender thiere. [Bacteria in the blood of living animals] Archiv für Hygiene, 4:129-148
 1887 - 
 1887 - textbook for hygiene schools (2nd ed. 1892)
 1890 - the bactericidal action of the blood and immunization
 1891 - immunization by alkalinization

References 

1843 births
1901 deaths
University of Würzburg alumni
University of Vienna alumni
Carbon monoxide
Hungarian scientists